Little Tobago is an uninhabited island of the British Virgin Islands in the Caribbean, located, along with sister island Great Tobago, approximately 3.6 nautical miles west of Jost Van Dyke. The Tobagos are the westernmost of the British Virgin Islands.

At  in size, it is surrounded by steep cliffs that also extend below the water. Since the 1990s, Great Tobago, Little Tobago islands, and nearby Mercurious and Watson Rocks are protected as part of the National Parks Trust.

There are over fifteen scuba diving sites. Though it's legal to snorkel and dive around the island, it is illegal to anchor because all potential anchoring locations are coral reefs that would be destroyed by an anchor. Large fines can occur if you violate this no-anchor zone, which is frequently patrolled by the BVI Marine Police.

References

Uninhabited islands of the British Virgin Islands